The 2009–10 season was the 100th season of competitive football by Ayr United.

Summary

Season 

In the 2009–10 season, Ayr United celebrated their centennial year by gaining promotion to The First Division after the play-off victory at The Excelsior Stadium against Airdrie United. Ayr were promoted after a five-year stint in the Second Division. Airdrie United were later rewarded First Division status after Livingston were double-relegated to the Fourth Tier of Scottish football for financial reasons. Ayr were promoted along with Fife side Raith Rovers; the other club joining the First Division after being absent for half a decade are Inverness Caledonian Thistle, who were relegated from the SPL at the end of the 2008–09 season. Ayr United were relegated at the end of the season when they finished bottom of the league.

Competitions

Pre-season

Scottish First Division

Scottish Challenge Cup

Scottish League Cup

Matches

Scottish Cup

2009–10 playing squad

Management and staff

Sponsorship

Goalscorers 

Players in Italics have now left the club

Players in on loan

Players out on loan

Departed players

Squad changes 

Boss Brian Reid made many changes to the squad during the Close-Season, bringing in Kevin James from St Johnstone, Kevin Cawley from Celtic, Craig Samson from Hereford United, Andy Aitken from Queen of the South, Billy Gibson from Clyde and David O'Brien from Dundee (Who only played one game before joining Stirling Albion) and departing were Scott Walker to join Alloa Athletic, Murray Henderson who went to sign for Stranraer, Alex Williams moving to Irish Club Dundalk, Allan Dempsie re-joining Elgin City and goalkeeper Fraser Stewart. There were many changes to the squad throughout the course of the season bringing several loan signings such as Australian Ryan McGowan a defensive-midfielder from Hearts, Stephen Reynolds a 20-year-old striker from St Johnstone brought in for one month as an emergency loan signing, Rocky Visconte another Australian from Hearts, Chris Mitchell a Scotland Under-21 defender, Daniel McKay from local-rivals Kilmarnock and Daniel Lafferty from Celtic. Brian Reid also David Mitchell out on loan to Stranraer to the end of the season, another player to leave the club on a temporary basis was Scott Agnew who joined Alloa Athletic until January then signed for Stranraer for the duration of the season. Players leaving the club on a permanent basis were Bryan Prunty and David Gormley who both joined Alloa, Chris Aitken who re-joined previous club Stirling Albion, Neil McGowan who signed for Clyde and fans-favourite Ryan Stevenson who joined SPL club Hearts for an undisclosed fee believed to be around £10k. players joining the club included Steve Bowey from English side Bedlington Terriers, Tam McManus from Derry City and Montserrat international Junior Mendes.

Final League Table

Scottish First Division

Results summary

Results by round

External links 
 Official Website
 Archive Site
 Unofficial Site and Fans Forum

Ayr United
Ayr United F.C. seasons